Johan Albert "Hans" Ankum (23 July 1930 – 3 June 2019) was a Dutch legal scholar. He was professor of Roman law, history of jurisprudence and juridical papyrology at the University of Amsterdam between 1965 and 1995.

Career
Ankum was born on 23 July 1930 in Amsterdam. He was researcher on juridical papyrology from 1960 to 1965 at the same university. Between 1965 and 1995 Ankum was professor of Roman law, history of jurisprudence and juridical papyrology.

Ankum became member of the Royal Netherlands Academy of Arts and Sciences in 1986. He died in Haarlem on 3 June 2019, aged 88.

References

1930 births
2019 deaths
Dutch legal scholars
Members of the Royal Netherlands Academy of Arts and Sciences
Scholars of Roman law
University of Amsterdam alumni
Academic staff of the University of Amsterdam